Saint Benno, St Benno or St. Benno may refer to:

People
Saint  (927–940)
Saint Benno of Meissen (bishop, 1066–1106)
Blessed Benno II of Osnabrück (bishop, 1068–1088)

Churches
Ermita de San Benón in Villarroya de los Pinares, Spain

Saint Benno's Church, Munich

Other
, school in Dresden
, Catholic publisher
St.-Benno-Viertel, area in Munich

See also
Benno (disambiguation)